Lake Shore is a census-designated place and unincorporated community in Anne Arundel County, Maryland, United States, located east of Pasadena. The population of Lake Shore was 19,477 at the 2010 census.

Geography
Lake Shore is located at  (39.098960, −76.481717), on the Hog Neck peninsula near Chesapeake Bay. It is partially bordered by tidal inlets to the bay, notably Magothy River to the south and Main Creek to the northeast. It is bordered by Pasadena to the west, with the boundary in the vicinity of Magothy Bridge Road. Maryland Route 177 (Mountain Road) is the main route through the community, running generally east–west along the center of the peninsula.

Demographics

As of the census of 2010, there were 19,477 people, 6,962 households, and 5,454 families residing in the CDP. The racial makeup of the CDP was 92.1% White, 3.7% African American, 0.3% Native American, 1.3% Asian, 0.1% Pacific Islander, 0.6% from other races, and 1.9% from two or more races. Hispanic or Latino of any race were 2.2% of the population.

There were 6,962 households, out of which 32.2% had children under the age of 18 living with them, 64.3% were married couples living together, 9.6% had a female householder with no husband present, and 21.7% were non-families. 16.7% of all households were made up of individuals, and 6.3% had someone living alone who was 65 years of age or older. The average household size was 2.8 and the average family size was 3.12.

In the CDP, the population was spread out, with 23.3% under the age of 18, 6.0% from 18 to 24, 24.4% from 25 to 44, 32.2% from 45 to 64, and 11.9% who were 65 years of age or older. The median age was 41.3 years. For every 100 females, there were 99.1 males. For every 100 females age 18 and over, there were 99 males.

The median income for a household in the CDP was $90,396, and the median income for a family was $103,540. Males had a median income of $67,397 versus $49,429 for females. The per capita income for the CDP was $37,743. About 2.1% of families and 3.4% of the population were below the poverty line, including 5.7% of those under age 18 and 3.8% of those age 65 or over.

Education

Children in Lake Shore are served by the following public schools in the Anne Arundel County Public Schools district:

Elementary Schools
 Bodkin Elementarty
 Fort Smallwood Elementary
 Jacobsville Elementary
 Lake Shore Elementary 
 Pasadena Elementary 

Middle Schools
 Chesapeake Bay Middle

High Schools
 Chesapeake High School

References

Census-designated places in Maryland
Census-designated places in Anne Arundel County, Maryland
Pasadena, Maryland
Maryland populated places on the Chesapeake Bay